MVCA may refer to:
 Mountain View Christian Academy, a K-12 school in Alabama, United States
 Mountain View College Academy, a high school in Valencia City, Philippines
 Miami Valley Christian Academy, a high school in Ohio, United States
 Motor Vehicle Consultants Association, a club in Toronto, Canada